To the Hilt is an album by Dutch rock band Golden Earring, released in 1976.

Track listing
All songs written by Hay and Kooymans except where noted.

"Why Me?" (John Fenton, Hay, Kooymans) – 7:13
"Facedancer" – 4:09
"To the Hilt" – 3:07
"Nomad" – 7:06
"Sleepwalkin'" – 5:00
"Latin Lightning" – 7:15
"Violins" – 10:21

Personnel
 George Kooymans - guitar, vocals
 Rinus Gerritsen - bass, keyboards
 Barry Hay - flute, vocals
 Cesar Zuiderwijk - drums
 Robert Jan Stips - keyboard

Additional personnel
Chris Mercer - saxophone, tenor saxophone
 Eelco Gelling - guitar
 Bertus Borgers - saxophone

Production
Producer: Golden Earring
Executive producer: Fred Haayen
Engineer: John Kriek
Assistant engineer: Robert Ash
String arrangements: Robert Jan Stips
Concept: George Hardie
Photography: Richard Manning

Charts

References 

Golden Earring albums
1976 albums
Albums with cover art by Hipgnosis
Polydor Records albums
MCA Records albums